Whaler's Monument, also known as The Whaling Monument (Norwegian: Hvalfangstmonumentet), is a  rotating bronze memorial statue situated by the harbor in Sandefjord, Norway. It is located at the end of Jernbanealleen, which is the main street in town.

The monument was created by Norwegian sculptor Knut Steen for which he won a competition in which more than one hundred sculptors had competed.
A commission was granted to  Knut Steen in 1953.  The work took seven years to complete. It was first unveiled in 1960 and has become one of his  most widely recognized works of sculpture.

It features an elegant, fishing boat raised by a whale fin. It depicts four  stylized figures of whalers with oars in an open boat, with harpoons ready and water spraying. It is made in the style of a compass rose and rotates slowly. Central parts are made of bronze and weighs 26 tons. The dramatic effect is enhanced by the water columns in the fountain that are regulated at different heights. The pool has 128 underwater lights. Around the fountain are stylized reliefs in granite from modern whaling.

The costs associated with the design and construction of the sculpture were donated to the city by shipowner and whaling magnate,  Lars Christensen. Earlier Consul Christensen had also funded the costs associated with the construction and development of the Sandefjord Museum.

Gallery

References

Sandefjord
Monuments and memorials in Norway